Jason Schultz (born March 29, 1973) is an American professional golfer.

Biography 
Schultz was born in Tampa, Florida. He played college golf at the University of Missouri.

Schultz played on the Nationwide Tour in 1999, 2001, 2003–05, and 2008–11. His best finish was a win at the 2005 Chattanooga Classic. He played on the Canadian Tour in 2002. He played on the PGA Tour in 2006 and 2007, where his best finish was T-24 at the 2006 B.C. Open.

Professional wins (1)

Nationwide Tour wins (1)

Nationwide Tour playoff record (1–0)

See also
2005 Nationwide Tour graduates
2006 PGA Tour Qualifying School graduates

References

External links

American male golfers
Missouri Tigers men's golfers
PGA Tour golfers
Korn Ferry Tour graduates
Golfers from Tampa, Florida
Golfers from Dallas
1973 births
Living people